Ed Bagdonas (June 20, 1937 – March 29, 1985) was an American athlete. He competed in the men's hammer throw at the 1960 Summer Olympics.

References

External links
 

1937 births
1985 deaths
Athletes (track and field) at the 1960 Summer Olympics
American male hammer throwers
Olympic track and field athletes of the United States
People from Winchendon, Massachusetts
Sportspeople from Worcester County, Massachusetts
Track and field athletes from Massachusetts